Todd Woodbridge and Mark Woodforde were the defending champions and won in the final 6–1, 6–3 against Ellis Ferreira and Patrick Galbraith.

Seeds
All sixteen seeded teams received byes into the second round.

Draw

Finals

Top half

Section 1

Section 2

Bottom half

Section 3

Section 4

References
 Official results archive (ATP)
 Official results archive (ITF)

Men's Doubles
Doubles